Monteola is an unincorporated community in Bee County, in the U.S. state of Texas. It is located within the Beeville micropolitan area.

History
The area in what is now known as Monteola today was first settled by Englishman George Cook and his daughter, Eliza, sometime before 1880. It was originally called Butler's Neighborhood for local ranchers L.G. and A.B. Butler in 1883. The first store and gin in the community were operated by Mase Lynch, who renamed the town Monteola for a peddler named Monty and his wife Ola. The store and gin continued to operate in 1939. Residents then left the community, and only a few scattered houses remained in the early 1990s.

Geography

Education
Monteola is served by the Pawnee Independent School District.

References

Unincorporated communities in Bee County, Texas
Unincorporated communities in Texas